The 2019–20 Florida State Seminoles women's basketball team, variously Florida State or FSU, represents Florida State University during the 2019–20 NCAA Division I women's basketball season. Florida State competes in Division I of the National Collegiate Athletic Association (NCAA). The Seminoles are led by head coach Sue Semrau, in her twenty-third year, and play their home games at the Donald L. Tucker Center on the university's Tallahassee, Florida campus. They are members of the Atlantic Coast Conference.

The Seminoles finished the season with a record of 24–8, 11–7 in the ACC, finishing in fourth place. Florida State reached the finals of the ACC tournament, finishing as runner-up. The NCAA tournament was canceled due to the coronavirus outbreak. Senior Forward Kiah Gillespie went on to be selected in the third round of the 2020 WNBA draft.

Previous season
For the 2018–19 season, the Seminoles finished with a record of 24–9, 10–6 in the ACC, to finish in sixth place.  Florida State was eliminated in the quarterfinals of the ACC tournament by NC State. The Seminoles received an at-large bid to the NCAA tournament as a five-seed, their seventh consecutive tournament appearance, and were defeated in the second round of the tournament by South Carolina.

Off-season

Recruiting Class

Source:

Roster

Rankings

Schedule and results

Source:

|-
!colspan=12 style="background:#; color:white;"| Regular season

|-
!colspan=12 style="background:#; color:white;"| ACC Women's Tournament

Honors

Katrina McClain Award finalist
Kiah Gillespie

All-ACC

First Team
Nicki Ekhomu
Kiah Gillespie

All-Americans

Nicki Ekhomu
Kiah Gillespie

References

External links
 

Florida State Seminoles women's basketball
Florida State
Florida State Seminoles women's basketball seasons